Breich is a small village lying in the western part of West Lothian, Scotland.  It lies on the A71, the Edinburgh to Ayrshire road, which also goes to the large town of Livingston 7 miles to the east. It is situated at the junction of the A706, to Lanark, Bathgate and Linlithgow.

Etymology
Breich is named after the nearby Breich Water. This name may be derived from Brittonic *brïch, meaning "variegated, mottled, speckled" (Welsh brych), or the early Gaelic cognate brecc. Derivation from Gaelic breac, meaning "trout", is possible, but the earliest form is Brech from 1199.

Demography
According to a 2015 West Lothian report, Breich has a population of 209.

Amenities and features
The village consists mainly of a single row of houses by the roadside, with some new builds behind the single row.  Breich railway station is on the Shotts Line, until 2018 was served by one eastbound and one westbound train per day. Since then, the line has been electrified the station has been rebuilt and is served by an hourly train in each direction. A nearby coal bing (spoil heap) was used as a speedway training track in the late 1960s.

Media
The Channel 4 TV comedy series Absolutely used Breich as a location for the fictional town of Stoneybridge, showing photographs of the houses by the roadside in a mock promotional video.  It also used the nearby 'Five Sisters' spoil heap in the same scene.

References

External links

Museum of the Scottish shale oil industry - Breich No. 1 & 2 pits
Canmore - Woodmuir Colliery, Pits Nos.5 and 6 site record

Villages in West Lothian